The 2024 United States House of Representatives elections in New Mexico will be held on November 5, 2024, to elect the three U.S. representatives from the State of New Mexico, one from all three of the state's congressional districts. The elections will coincide with the 2024 U.S. presidential election, as well as other elections to the House of Representatives, elections to the United States Senate, and various state and local elections.

District 1

The 1st district covers the center of the state, taking in the counties of Torrance, Guadalupe, De Baca, and Lincoln, as well as eastern Bernalillo County and most of Albuquerque. The incumbent is Democrat Melanie Stansbury, who was re-elected with 55.7% of the vote in 2022.

Democratic primary

Candidates

Potential
Melanie Stansbury, incumbent U.S. Representative (2021–present)

General election

Predictions

District 2

The 2nd district encapsulates southern and western New Mexico, including the cities of Las Cruces, Carlsbad, and Alamogordo, as well as the southwestern suburbs of Albuquerque. The incumbent is Democrat Gabe Vasquez, who flipped the district and was elected with 50.3% of the vote in 2022.

Democratic primary

Candidates

Potential
Gabe Vasquez, incumbent U.S. Representative (2023–present)

Republican primary

Candidates

Potential
Yvette Herrell, former U.S. Representative (2021–2023)

General election

Predictions

District 3

The 3rd district covers the northern and eastern parts of the state, taking in the cities of Santa Fe, Roswell, Farmington, and Clovis, as well as parts of the Navajo Nation. The incumbent is Democrat Teresa Leger Fernandez, who was re-elected with 58.2% of the vote in 2020.

Democratic primary

Candidates

Potential
Teresa Leger Fernandez, incumbent U.S. Representative (2021–present)

General election

Predictions

References

2024
New Mexico
United States House of Representatives